The expression "1000 percent" or "1000%" in a literal sense means one thousand in every hundred, and is used as a deliberate hyperbolism used for effect. In American English it is used as a metaphor meaning very high emphasis, or enthusiastic support. It was used in the 1972 U.S. presidential election by presidential candidate George McGovern, who endorsed his running mate, Thomas Eagleton, "1000 percent" following a scandal, then soon after dropped him. Communication experts Judith Trent and Jimmy Trent agree with journalist Theodore H. White, who called it "possibly the most damaging single faux pas ever made by a presidential candidate".

1972 election
It was used by Democratic presidential candidate George McGovern in 1972. It backfired badly and became a byword for foolish and insincere exaggeration, and today is often used in irony or sarcasm.

On July 25, 1972, just over two weeks after the 1972 Democratic Convention, McGovern's running mate for vice president, Thomas Eagleton, admitted the truth of news reports that he had received electroshock therapy for clinical depression during the 1960s, a fact kept secret from McGovern. However, McGovern had been running an emotional crusade against incumbent President Richard Nixon, with Nixon supporters counterattacking by suggesting that McGovern was crazy. The new evidence that his running mate had secretly undergone psychiatric treatment three times for mental illness destroyed the McGovern strategy. Eagleton was hospitalized in 1960 for four weeks for "exhaustion and fatigue". He was hospitalized for four days at the Mayo Clinic in 1964, and for three weeks in 1966. He twice underwent electroshock therapy for depression. Influential Democrats questioned both Eagleton's ability to handle the office of Vice President and McGovern's competence in choosing top officials. In response to intense pressure from the media and party leaders that Eagleton be replaced, McGovern announced that he was "1000 percent behind Tom Eagleton, and I have no intention of dropping him from the ticket".

McGovern subsequently consulted with psychiatrists, including Eagleton's own doctors, who advised him that a recurrence of Eagleton's depression was possible and could endanger the country should Eagleton become president. Consequently, on July 31, McGovern announced that he had reversed his position "in the interest of the nation", and Eagleton announced that he was withdrawing his candidacy to prevent continued diversion from greater issues, and for the sake of party unity.

Theodore H. White, the journalist who followed the campaign most closely, reports that the "1000 percent" phrase was repeatedly mentioned over and over again by voters and damaged McGovern even more than his actual reversal of support for Eagleton. The reason, according to Trent and Trent, was that McGovern's rhetoric throughout the campaign had been intensely moralistic and hyperbolic: he repeatedly emphasized his moral superiority over Nixon and Nixon's supporters. For example, in one speech McGovern attacked some Nixon advocates as "lousy, bitter, paranoid, predictable, despicable, obnoxious propagandists who are consistently wrong and who write nothing good about any candidate more liberal than Genghis Khan". But now his own extreme language was exposed as fraudulent by his use of the 1000% metaphor.

Other uses
The phrase was used long before 1972 by American politicians in a non-sarcastic fashion to indicate strong support for a political proposal. For example, retired President Harry Truman used it in his 1956 Memoirs. Congressman Thomas used it to announce his support for controversial Senator Joe McCarthy in 1954. Journalist Georgie Anne Geyer spoke of her "profound reluctance to get involved in just about any military endeavor that was not a clear win, that did not have 1,000 percent support of the American people".

Writers used it often. For example, novelist Truman Capote wrote in 1958: "Prison is where she belongs. And my husband agrees one thousand percent."  Novelist Allen Drury has a character in his political novel Advise and Consent (1959) state: "Those coal people, those pinball people. I want them behind us a thousand percent."

"Let's bat a thousand percent" is a common baseball saying since the 1920s, when Babe Ruth used it.

In private life the term is used to indicate high support in high-tension situations. Thus: "I would have expected 1000 percent support from my husband and yet I got none." "Thanks to both of you for your 1000 percent support on this [missionary] journey."

When Donald Trump declared his candidacy for the U.S. presidency, his younger brother Robert told the New York Post: "I support Donald 1,000 percent. If he were to need me in any way, I’d be there."

References

Further reading
 Bormann, Ernest G. "The Eagleton affair: A fantasy theme analysis". Quarterly Journal of Speech 59.2 (1973): 143–159.
 Giglio, James N. "The Eagleton Affair: Thomas Eagleton, George McGovern, and the 1972 Vice Presidential Nomination," Presidential Studies Quarterly (2009) 39#4, p. 647–676 
 Glasser, Joshua M. Eighteen-Day Running Mate: McGovern, Eagleton, and a Campaign in Crisis (Yale University Press, 2012). comprehensive scholarly history
 Hendrickson, Paul. "George McGovern & the Coldest Plunge", The Washington Post, September 28, 1983
 Strout, Lawrence N. "Politics and mental illness: The campaigns of Thomas Eagleton and Lawton Chiles". Journal of American Culture 18.3 (1995): 67–73.
 Trent, Judith S., and Jimmie D. Trent. "The rhetoric of the challenger: George Stanley McGovern". Communication Studies 25#1 (1974): 11–18.
 White, Theodore. The Making of the President, 1972 (1973) 
 "McGovern's First Crisis: The Eagleton Affair", Time, August 7, 1972, cover story
 "George McGovern Finally Finds a Veep", Time, August 14, 1972, cover story

Primary sources
 McGovern, George S., Grassroots: The Autobiography of George McGovern, New York: Random House, 1977, pp. 214–215
 McGovern, George S., Terry: My Daughter's Life-and-Death Struggle with Alcoholism, New York: Random House, 1996, p. 97
 The New York Times, "'Trashing' Candidates" (op-ed) by George McGovern, May 11, 1983

1972 United States presidential election
Political terminology of the United States